This is a list of the train stations with the highest Amtrak ridership the United States in the fiscal year 2020 (October 2019 to September 2020). Ridership figures from 2015, 2016, 2017, 2018, and 2019 have been provided for comparative purposes. In the fiscal year 2020, ridership was down significantly across the board due to the effects of the COVID-19 pandemic. The rankings exclude Amtrak stations located in Canada. Ridership numbers are for Amtrak only—commuter rail, subway, and other modes are not included.

See also
List of busiest railway stations in North America
List of Amtrak stations

References

Amtrak
Railway stations, Amtrak
United States
Amt
Busiest railway stations, Amtrak